is a Japanese football player for Verspah Oita.

Club statistics
Updated to 20 February 2017.

References

External links

1986 births
Living people
University of Tsukuba alumni
Association football people from Hyōgo Prefecture
Japanese footballers
J1 League players
J2 League players
Japan Football League players
Shimizu S-Pulse players
Oita Trinita players
Verspah Oita players
Association football forwards